Yumurcak TV was a Turkish television network for children which was owned and operated by Samanyolu Yayıncılık A.Ş. On 19 July 2016, its license was revoked and the channel closed by the Radio and Television Supreme Council due to alleged links with the Gülen Movement following the 2016 Turkish coup d'état attempt.

References

External links

Children's television networks
Defunct television channels in Turkey
Television channels and stations established in 2007
Television channels and stations disestablished in 2016